Vikipalu is a village in Anija Parish, Harju County in northern Estonia, located about 5 km east of the town of Kehra. It has a population of 61 (as of 1 January 2010).

Most of the village's territory is covered with forest. River Aavoja flows through the village.

Vikipalu has a station on the Elron western route. It was established in 1939 and named "Lahinguvälja" (Estonian for "Battlefield") to commemorate the Battle of Kehra (4 January 1919). 1957–2009 it bore the name of "Vikipalu". In May 2009 its original name was restored.

References

Villages in Harju County